Abdulakh Tilovurovich Khaybulayev (born on 19 August 2001) is a professional footballer who plays as a midfielder for Samtredia in the Erovnuli Liga, on loan from Azerbaijan Premier League club Sabah.

Career

Club
On 4 May 2021, Khaybulayev made his debut in the Azerbaijan Premier League for Sabah match against Sumgayit.

On 28 January 2023, Khaybulayev joined Samtredia on loan until December 2023.

References

External links
 

2001 births
Living people
Association football midfielders
Azerbaijani footballers
Azerbaijan youth international footballers
Azerbaijan under-21 international footballers
Azerbaijan Premier League players
Sabah FC (Azerbaijan) players
FC Samtredia players